Wolfgang Pickl is an Austrian Paralympic athlete. He represented Austria at seven editions of the Paralympics: the 1980 Summer Paralympics and the Winter Paralympics of 1976, 1980, 1984, 1988, 1992 and 1994.

He competed in alpine skiing, cross-country skiing, biathlon and track and field events.

In total he won one silver medal and three bronze medals at the Paralympics.

References

External links 
 

Living people
Year of birth missing (living people)
Place of birth missing (living people)
Cross-country skiers at the 1976 Winter Paralympics
Alpine skiers at the 1980 Winter Paralympics
Athletes (track and field) at the 1980 Summer Paralympics
Cross-country skiers at the 1984 Winter Paralympics
Cross-country skiers at the 1988 Winter Paralympics
Biathletes at the 1988 Winter Paralympics
Cross-country skiers at the 1992 Winter Paralympics
Biathletes at the 1992 Winter Paralympics
Cross-country skiers at the 1994 Winter Paralympics
Biathletes at the 1994 Winter Paralympics
Medalists at the 1976 Winter Paralympics
Medalists at the 1980 Summer Paralympics
Medalists at the 1988 Winter Paralympics
Paralympic medalists in athletics (track and field)
Paralympic silver medalists for Austria
Paralympic bronze medalists for Austria
Paralympic athletes of Austria
20th-century Austrian people